Kurbads is the fifth studio album by the Latvian folk metal band Skyforger. The album was released on 26 April 2010 in Europe and on 11 May 2010 in the United States through Metal Blade Records.

Recording and production 

On 12 September 2008, Skyforger announced that the band had entered the studio to record their newest album. The recording took place at the band's former folk instrumentalist Kaspars' studio "Lauska", who was not an active member of the band anymore, but handled the sound engineering duties and appeared on the album. On May 7, 2009 the frontman Pēteris revealed the title and theme of the album. On 2 March, 2010 Skyforger posted online their first single "Son of the Mare" and revealed album cover, as well as the track list. One day later the band published a studio report on their official YouTube channel. In a later interview Pēteris recalled the album's recording process:

Musical style and lyrical themes 

On the same Facebook post revealing the album's title and theme Pēteris also described the meaning of the name "Kurbads" and what to expect lyric-wise:

Alex Henderson of Allmusic in review described the musical style of the album as an "epic combination of black metal, death metal, thrash metal, Bathory, Iron Maiden, and East European folk".

Reception 

Kurbads has received positive reviews from music critics. George Pacheco of About.com gave the album 4 out of 5 stars and called it the band's "stylistic and creative peak." Mike Stagno of Sputnikmusic gave the album 3 out of 5 stars and summarized his review as "A solid, if generally unspectacular offering from Latvia's finest."

The album's only weak points, as noted by the reviewers, is the cover art that George Pacheco called "cheesy", as well as the vocal delivery of Pēteris whose harsh shouts Mike Stagno described as "irritating at the best of times" and noted the lack of high pitched growl utilization.

Track listing 

 Curse of the Witch – 05:04
 Son of the Mare – 05:26
 The Nine-headed – 03:56
 Bewitched Forest – 05:15
 In the Yard of the Father's Son – 00:39
 The Devilslayer – 05:05
 The Stone Sentinel – 04:56
 In the Underworld – 04:13
 Black Rider – 04:16
 The Last Battle – 05:38
 Kurbads (bonus track) – 05:11

Personnel 

Skyforger
 Edgars "Zirgs" – bass, ģīga, backing vocals
 Pēteris "Peter" – vocals, guitars, lyrics
 Edgars "Mazais" – drums, backing vocals
 Kaspars Bārbals – dūdas, kokles, stabule, backing vocals
 Mārtiņš Pētersons – guitars, backing vocals

Guest musicians
 Sandis Korps – additional vocals
 Ģirts "Motors" Kļaviņš – additional vocals

Other personnel
 Gerda Buša – photography
 Gints Lundbergs – mixing, mastering
 Pēteris "Peter" – design, English translations, layout
 Andis "Hopkins" – English translations
 Ojārs Kalniņš – English translations
 Valdis Bērzvads – design, layout
 Mārtiņš Pētersons – cover art, artwork

References

External links 
 Official translation of the lyrics in English

2010 albums
Skyforger albums
Metal Blade Records albums